Carrier-based aircraft, sometimes known as carrier-capable aircraft or carrier-borne aircraft, are naval aircraft designed for operations from aircraft carriers. They must be able to launch in a short distance and be sturdy enough to withstand the abrupt forces of launching from and recovering on a pitching deck. In addition, their wings are generally able to fold up, easing operations in tight quarters.

Such aircraft are designed for many purposes including air-to-air combat, surface attack, anti-submarine warfare (ASW), search and rescue (SAR), transport (COD), weather observation, reconnaissance and airborne early warning and control (AEW&C) duties.

The term is generally applied only to fixed-wing aircraft, as naval helicopters are able to operate from a wider variety of ships, including helicopter carriers, destroyers, frigates and container ships.

History

The 1903 advent of fixed-wing aircraft was followed in 1910 by the first flight of an aircraft from the  deck of an anchored warship (the United States Navy's ), and in 1912, by the first flight of an aircraft from the deck of a warship underway (the Royal Navy's ). With these developments, the need for specialized aircraft adapted for take-offs and landings from the flight decks of those ships became recognized.

The significance of air power grew between the wars, driven by the increased range, carrying power, and effectiveness of carrier-launched aircraft, until it became impossible to disregard its importance during World War II, following the loss of many warships to aircraft, including the sinking of Prince of Wales and Repulse, the Battle of Taranto, the Attack on Pearl Harbor and numerous other incidents. Following the war, carrier operations continued to increase in size and importance.

Types
Modern carrier-based aircraft are built in mainly three different versions to suit the needs of its various users. 
The following terms are those used currently by the U.S. Navy.

Catapult-assisted take-off but arrested recovery
CATOBAR is a system used for the launch and recovery of aircraft from the deck of an aircraft carrier. Under this technique, aircraft are launched using a catapult-assisted take-off and landing on the ship using arresting wires. Although this system is more costly than alternative methods, it provides greater flexibility in carrier operations, since it allows the aircraft to operate with higher payloads.

The use of catapults allows an aircraft carrier to launch large fixed-wing aircraft. For example, the U.S. Navy launches its E-2 Hawkeye AEW aircraft and C-2A Greyhound cargo aircraft with catapults.

Short take-off and vertical landing
STOVL take-offs are accomplished with "ski-jumps", instead of a catapult. STOVL use usually allows aircraft to carry a larger payload as compared to during VTOL use, while avoiding the complexity of a catapult. The best known example is the Hawker Siddeley Harrier Jump Jet, despite being capable of VTOL take-offs, is usually operated as a STOVL aircraft to increase its fuel and weapons load.

Short take-off but arrested recovery
STOBAR is a system used for the launch and recovery of aircraft from the deck of an aircraft carrier, combining elements of both STOVL and CATOBAR. Aircraft launch under their own power using a ski-jump to assist take-off (rather than using a catapult). These are conventional aircraft however and require arresting wires to land on the ship. The Kuznetsov-class aircraft carriers of the Russian Navy and People's Liberation Army Navy operate the Su-33 (Russia) and J-15 (China) as STOBAR aircraft.

Unassisted take-off

Prior to World War II, the weight of most aircraft allowed them to be launched from aircraft carriers under their own power, but required assistance in stopping. Catapults were installed but were used only when the ship was stationary or adequate wind over the deck could not be arranged by sailing into the wind. Even aircraft as large as the North American B-25 Mitchell were launched in this manner. This was possible because the ship's speed with even the lightest prevailing winds, combined with a low take-off speed allowed early aircraft to gain flying speed in a very short distance. The most extreme version of this was the battleship platforms used during the 1920s when small, World War I-era biplane fighters such as the Sopwith Camel were launched from only a few dozen feet long mounted atop of a battleship's forward gun turret.

Conventional aircraft, such as the Curtiss P-40 Warhawk, Republic P-47 Thunderbolt, Supermarine Spitfire, and Hawker Hurricane, were often delivered to overseas air bases by aircraft carrier.  They would be loaded onto an aircraft carrier in port by cranes, flown off the carrier at sea near their destination under their own power, and land on a friendly airfield ashore.  These were not usually combat missions but in some cases the launched aircraft provided air cover for the ship, and the aircraft could not be recovered by the carrier.

Some STOL aircraft, such as the North American Rockwell OV-10 Bronco, have been operated from aircraft carriers and amphibious assault ships in this manner more recently, but this is not common practice.

Even very large aircraft such as the Lockheed C-130 Hercules have been successfully landed and launched from large aircraft carriers, but was done with no cargo and little fuel on board the aircraft.

Modern carrier-based aircraft in service

In service

 Boeing EA-18G Growler
 Boeing F/A-18E/F Super Hornet
 Dassault Rafale M
 Grumman C-2 Greyhound
 Lockheed Martin F-35B/C Lightning II
 McDonnell Douglas AV-8B Harrier II
 McDonnell Douglas F/A-18 Hornet   
 McDonnell Douglas T-45 Goshawk
 Mikoyan MiG-29K
 Northrop Grumman E-2 Hawkeye
 Shenyang J-15
 Sukhoi Su-25UTG/UBP 
 Sukhoi Su-33

Under development
 Boeing MQ-25 Stingray
 Bayraktar MIUS
 Bayraktar TB3
 HAL TEDBF
 Shenyang FC-31 naval variant

See also
Escort carrier
Launch and recovery cycle
Modern United States Navy carrier air operations
Naval aviation
Carrier aircraft used during World War II

References

Notes

Bibliography

Chant, Chris. "Aircraft of World War II" Barnes & Noble: New York (1999) 
Collier, Basil. "Japanese Aircraft of World War II" Mayflower: New York (1979) 

Gunston, Bill. "Combat Aircraft of World War II" Salamander Books: London (1978) 
Munson, Kenneth. "Aircraft of World War II" Doubleday: New York
Pawlowski, Gareth L. "Flat-Tops and Fledglings" Castle Books: New York (1971) 
Clark G. Reynolds. The fast carriers: the forging of an air navy (1968; 1978; 1992)

External links